Nephi is one of the central figures described in the Book of Mormon. In Mormonism, he is described as the son of Lehi, a prophet, founder of the Nephite people, and author of the first two books of the Book of Mormon, First and Second Nephi.

Early life 

According to the Book of Mormon, Nephi was the fourth of six sons of Lehi and Sariah, believed to have been born in 615 BC. Nephi and his family lived in Jerusalem, circa 600 BC, during the reign of King Zedekiah, until Lehi was commanded by God to take his family and flee into the wilderness. Before their flight, Nephi's father prophesied the impending destruction and captivity of Jerusalem by the armies of Babylon.

Family tree 

Nephi also mentions having sisters, though he does not mention their names or birth orders.

Exodus 
In the narrative of the Book of Nephi, Nephi and his family left Jerusalem, traveled to the Red Sea, and then journeyed three days further into the wilderness, stopping in a valley by a river near the Red Sea. Lehi then sent his four sons (Laman, Lemuel, Sam and Nephi) back to Jerusalem to get the brass plates. After successfully obtaining the Brass Plates, they were commanded to return to Jerusalem a second time to bring Ishmael's family for the purpose of providing spouses for Lehi's children.

The Plates of Brass 
A powerful man named Laban was in possession of the Plates of Brass, a record kept by the Jews which contained their laws, customs, history, and lineage. Nephi and his brothers tried three times to get the brass plates from Laban. First, they sent Laman, who simply asked Laban for the plates. Laban tried to kill Laman, accusing him of being a thief. Laman fled back to his brothers, extremely upset. The second time, Nephi convinced his brothers to try to buy the plates using their abandoned wealth. Laban wanted the riches but wouldn't give up the plates, sending his servants to kill them. They ran for their lives and their wealth fell into Laban's possession. The four brothers hid in a cave. Laman and Lemuel started to beat their younger brothers severely. An angel appeared and stopped them, telling Laman and Lemuel that, because of his righteousness, the Lord had made Nephi "a teacher and a ruler over them." Finally, Nephi returned to try one last time. Before he got to the house of Laban, he found a drunken man passed out in the street. The man was Laban. Nephi was then commanded by the Lord to kill Laban, an idea he struggled with because he had never before "shed the blood of man." The Spirit told him that it is better for "one man to perish than for an entire nation to dwindle and perish in unbelief." Nephi followed through with the command and then dressed himself in Laban's clothing and armor. He returned to Laban's house and ordered Zoram, one of Laban's servants, to bring him the Plates of Brass. He then led Zoram back to where his brothers were hiding. Laman, Lemuel, and Sam, seeing Nephi disguised as Laban were afraid and turned to flee. Nephi called out to them. When Zoram saw Nephi's brothers, he turned to run, but Nephi stopped him. Nephi promised Zoram "that he should be a free man like unto us if he would go down in the wilderness with us," to which Zoram agreed.

Eight years in the wilderness and flight to the Promised Land 
Nephi spent eight years in the wilderness, facing many hardships, including the breaking of his bow which made it impossible to obtain food, and Nephi's elder brothers Laman and Lemuel rebelling against him and his father Lehi. Nephi's rebellious older brothers attempted to kill him on at least two occasions.

Finally, in the land of Bountiful, Nephi is commanded by God to build a ship and sail to the "Promised Land" or the Americas. However, Laman and Lemuel do not think he should, saying, "Our brother is a fool, for he thinketh that he can build a ship; yea, and he also thinketh that he can cross these great waters." They then proceed to try to throw Nephi into the depths of the sea; however, Nephi commands them not to. He does this by saying, "In the name of the Almighty God, I command you that ye touch me not, for I am filled with the power of God, even unto the consuming of my flesh; and whoso shall lay his hands upon me shall wither even as a dried reed; and he shall be as naught before the power of God, for God shall smite him." Some LDS scholars believe this occurred somewhere along the coasts of present-day Dhufar, Oman.

Life in the Promised Land, Temple, King of the Nephites, and death 

Not long after arriving in the Americas, Lehi died, leaving the leadership of their colony in Nephi's hands. His brothers Laman and Lemuel rebelled shortly thereafter, and the colony split into two. Nephi's followers named themselves "Nephites", while the others were dubbed "Lamanites". Nephites separate into the wilderness, where they begin building in the land of Nephi. Within twenty one years of arriving in the promised land, Nephi's people construct a temple. Under Nephi's leadership the Nephite civilization prospered despite occasional war with the Lamanites. According to the Book of Mormon, Nephi was revered by his people. Upon his death, the charge of keeping the sacred records of the Book of Mormon was passed to his brother Jacob.

Teachings 

Nephi is credited with several major contributions to Mormon doctrine and teachings. After his father received his Vision of the Tree of Life, Nephi received a similar vision and recorded it in more detail, including an interpretation of each element of the dream. The dream and Nephi's interpretation are quoted often by Latter-Day Saints. Nephi also saw and recorded details of the birth, life, and crucifixion of Jesus Christ – the first such relation to occur in the text of the Book of Mormon. An angel also showed him things similar to the vision of John the Revelator which is canonized in the Book of Revelation.

Nephi quoted extensively from the Book of Isaiah. Between the books of First and Second Nephi 18 chapters of Isaiah are recorded almost verbatim as they appear in the King James Version of the Bible.

One of the most often quoted Book of Mormon scriptures was penned by Nephi describing his decision to obey his father Lehi's commandment to return to Jerusalem to obtain the Brass Plates:

7 And it came to pass that I, Nephi, said unto my father: I will go and do the things which the Lord hath commanded, for I know that the Lord giveth no commandments unto the children of men, save he shall prepare a way for them that they may accomplish the thing which he commandeth them.

Nephi also recorded his thoughts on his own inadequacy as a disciple of Christ in what is regarded by some as among the most beautiful prose in the Book of Mormon. Recorded in chapter four of Second Nephi, it has been dubbed the Psalm of Nephi. A portion of the passage is given below:

And when I desire to rejoice, my heart groaneth because of my sins; nevertheless, I know in whom I have trusted. My God hath been my support; he hath led me through mine afflictions in the wilderness; and he hath preserved me upon the waters of the great deep. He hath filled me with his love, even unto the consuming of my flesh. He hath confounded mine enemies, unto the causing of them to quake before me. Behold, he hath heard my cry by day, and he hath given me knowledge by visions in the night-time.

Nephi's legacy 
The first major figure in the Book of Mormon, Nephi is regarded by members of the Latter Day Saint Movement as a prophet, political leader, and record keeper. A number of individuals throughout the Book of Mormon were named after him, including all of the kings in the early Nephite civilization. Additionally, his people referred to themselves as "Nephites" – a name that would follow them through the entire 1000-year history given in the Book of Mormon.

Nephi is also used as a personal name amongst contemporary Latter-day Saints.

Etymology of Nephi 
The origin of the name Nephi is uncertain, and disputed. Based on a non-Latter Day Saint or secular perspective, hypotheses for the name's origin include:

 its appearance as a geographic name in 2 Maccabees of the Apocrypha ("And Neemias called this thing Naphthar, which is as much as to say, a cleansing: but many men call it Nephi.")
 the shortening of two personal names Nephish and Nephishesim in the Authorized King James Version,
 a reference to the nephilim ( נְפִילִים ), who are the mythical half-immortal "giants" described in Genesis; the name means "fallen ones."
 a reference to the work Nephiomaoth, which "was one of the magic names of God in early Christian Gnosticism"
 or the term Nephes, which is a Kabbalistic term for a ghost that wanders around sepulchers.

Religious scholars of the Church of Jesus Christ of Latter Day Saints generally believe that the Book of Mormon is historical, and therefore have proposed etymologies consistent with that view. For example, Latter Day Saint scholar John Gee theorizes that Nephi is a Hebrew form of the Egyptian name Nfr. In Phoenician and Aramaic inscriptions of Egyptian names containing nfr, the nfr element is rendered npy, and the closely related Hebrew language would presumably transcribe the name the same way. Hugh Nibley has suggested that the name Nephi is related to the Egyptian Nehri. Some scholars of the Church of Jesus Christ of Latter Day Saints have proposed that the name Nephi is related to the Hebrew word nephesh (נֶפֶש), which literally means the "complete life of a being" though it is usually used in the sense of "living being" (breathing creature). Psyche is the equivalent New Testament Greek word from which the English word soul is only translated. In the Greek Septuagint nephesh is mostly translated as psyche (ψυχή). Other scholars of the Church of Jesus Christ of Latter Day Saints propose that the term is a variant of the Arabic and Hebrew words for prophet: Nabi.

See also
 Reformed Egyptian
 First Book of Nephi
 Second Book of Nephi
 Plates of Nephi
 Nephites
 Nephi, Utah, named after him.

References

Further reading

Steven L. Olsen, "Nephi’s Literary Endeavor", in Religious Educator 4, no. 3 (2003): 133–141.
 Daniel C. Peterson, "Nephi and His Asherah", Journal of Book of Mormon Studies 9/2 (2000): 16–25.

External links

Angelic visionaries
Book of Mormon prophets